The Kazakhstan Rugby Union is the governing body for rugby union in Kazakhstan. It is a member of the International Rugby Board.

The Union organises the Kazakhstan national rugby union team, known as the Nomads.

See also
 Rugby union in Kazakhstan

External links
 Official site
 Tries and Tribulations
 Luke O'Callaghan's Blog about Kazakhstan Rugby

Rugby union in Kazakhstan
Rugby union governing bodies in Europe